Adolph E. Waller (August 24, 1892 – January 28 1975) was a professor of botany and genetics. Waller was a member of the faculty of The Ohio State University for 45 years, where he was an authority on iris breeding and horticulture, plant ecology and genetics.

References

1892 births
1975 deaths
People from Louisville, Kentucky
20th-century American botanists
Ohio State University faculty
University of Kentucky alumni
University of Michigan alumni
Ohio State University alumni